Iraklis Doriadis (born ) is a retired Greek male volleyball player and volleyball coach. He has 292 appearances with Greece men's national volleyball team. He played for Olympiacos for 9 years (1977-1986), winning numerous titles. He was also the coach of Olympiacos Women's Volleyball Team.

Clubs
  Olympiacos (1977-1986)

References

1954 births
Living people
Greek men's volleyball players
Olympiacos S.C. players
Olympiacos Women's Volleyball coaches
Constantinopolitan Greeks
Volleyball players from Istanbul